Mark 41 or Mk 41 may refer to

 Mark 41 Vertical Launch System, a ship-based missile launcher
 Mk 41 or B41 nuclear bomb, the highest-yield nuclear bomb designed by the United States military